You Again is a 2010 American comedy film.

You Again may also refer to:

 You Again (album), by the Forester Sisters, 1987
 "You Again" (song), the album's title track
 You Again?, a sitcom
 "You Again", a 1995 song by Shihad from Killjoy

See also
It's You Again (disambiguation)